Chixoy may refer to:

Chixoy River
Chixoy Hydroelectric Dam